"My Baby's Got a Smile on Her Face" is a song by American country singer Craig Wayne Boyd. It was Boyd's coronation single following his victory on the seventh season of the singing competition The Voice.

History
Show judge Blake Shelton gave Boyd the song, and said that he originally planned to record it himself. The song was written by Mark Marchetti, a son-in-law of Loretta Lynn, and Stephanie Jones.

Music video
Boyd debuted the video in December 2014.

Chart performance
The song debuted in the top 40 of the Hot 100 as well as at number 1 on the Hot Country Songs chart dated for January 3, 2015. In doing so, it became only the second song to debut at number 1 in that chart's history, the first being "More Than a Memory" by Garth Brooks in 2007. The following week it fell completely off both charts, making it the shortest charting number one in the history of the Billboard country charts.

References

2014 debut singles
Dot Records singles
Craig Wayne Boyd songs
2014 songs